Marian Markiewicz (8 December 1895 – 14 December 1965) was a Polish footballer. He played in three matches for the Poland national football team in 1924. He was also part of Poland's squad for the football tournament at the 1924 Summer Olympics, but he did not play in any matches.

References

External links
 

1895 births
1965 deaths
Polish footballers
Poland international footballers
Association football forwards
Footballers from Kraków
Wisła Kraków players